During the 1991–92 English football season, Derby County F.C. competed in the Football League Second Division, following relegation from the First Division the previous season.

Season summary
Despite the loss of key players like Mark Wright and Dean Saunders, Derby County emerged as genuine contenders for an automatic return to English football's top flight (which would be renamed the FA Premier League from the start of the next season) after the takeover by Lionel Pickering made Derby one of the richest clubs in the Second Division. Derby smashed their transfer record twice during the season, signing striker Paul Kitson for £1.3 million from East Midlands rivals Leicester City in March, followed by the signing of striker Tommy Johnson from First Division strugglers Notts County for the same fee. Club legend Bobby Davison was also re-signed, on loan from Leeds United; he scored 8 goals in 10 games to reach a century of goals for the Rams. However, in spite of this flurry of transfer activity and breaking the club's record for away wins (12) Derby were unable to gain automatic promotion, finishing two points adrift of second-placed Middlesbrough. Derby qualified for the playoffs, but were knocked out in the semi-finals by Blackburn Rovers on a 5–4 scoreline over two legs.

At the end of the season, Scottish winger Ted McMinn was named the club's player of the season.

November saw the death of former chairman Robert Maxwell, who had just sold the club to Lionel Pickering earlier in the year. Maxwell disappeared from his luxury yacht, the Lady Ghislaine, while it was cruising off the Canary Islands; his body was later found drifting in the Atlantic Ocean. His death was officially ruled as accidental drowning after he supposedly fell off the yacht, though commentators have alleged it was murder or suicide.

Kit
Derby's kit was manufactured by English company Umbro and were sponsored by Auto Windscreens.

First-team squad
Squad at end of season

Left club during season

Transfers

In
  Marco Gabbiadini –  Crystal Palace, £1,000,000 
  Paul Simpson –  Oxford United, £500,000, February
  Paul Kitson –  Leicester City, £1,300,000, March
  Tommy Johnson –  Notts County, £1,300,000, March
  Bobby Davison –  Leeds United, loan

Out
  Mark Wright –  Liverpool, £2,500,000, 15 July (national record for defender)
  Dean Saunders –  Liverpool, £2,900,000, 19 July (national record for any player)
  Phil Gee –  Leicester City, part-exchange for Kitson, March
  Ian Ormondroyd –  Leicester City, part-exchange for Kitson, March

Results

Football League Second Division

Second Division

August

September

October
 19 October: Derby County 2–0 Portsmouth

November
 6 November: Port Vale 1–0 Derby County

December

January

February
 1 February: Portsmouth 0–1 Derby County

March
 11 March: Derby County 3–1 Port Vale

April

Unknown date
 Derby County 1–1 Barnsley
 Derby County 0–2 Blackburn Rovers
 Derby County 3–1 Brighton & Hove Albion
 Derby County 4–1 Bristol City
 Derby County 1–0 Bristol Rovers
 Derby County 0–0 Cambridge United
 Derby County 1–2 Charlton Athletic
 Derby County 2–1 Grimsby Town
 Derby County 1–0 Ipswich Town
 Derby County 1–2 Leicester City
 Derby County 2–0 Middlesbrough
 Derby County 0–2 Millwall
 Derby County 4–1 Newcastle United
 Derby County 2–2 Oxford United
 Derby County 2–0 Plymouth Argyle
 Derby County 1–2 Southend United
 Derby County 1–2 Sunderland
 Derby County 2–1 Swindon Town
 Derby County 0–1 Tranmere Rovers
 Derby County 3–1 Watford
 Derby County 1–2 Wolverhampton Wanderers
 Barnsley 0–3 Derby County
 Blackburn Rovers 2–0 Derby County
 Brighton & Hove Albion 1–2 Derby County
 Bristol City 1–2 Derby County
 Bristol Rovers 2–3 Derby County
 Cambridge United 0–0 Derby County
 Charlton Athletic 0–2 Derby County
 Grimsby Town 0–1 Derby County
 Ipswich Town 2–1 Derby County
 Leicester City 1–2 Derby County
 Middlesbrough 1–1 Derby County
 Millwall 1–2 Derby County
 Newcastle United 2–2 Derby County
 Oxford United 2–0 Derby County
 Plymouth Argyle 1–1 Derby County
 Southend United 1–0 Derby County
 Sunderland 1–1 Derby County
 Swindon Town 1–2 Derby County
 Tranmere Rovers 4–3 Derby County
 Watford 1–2 Derby County
 Wolverhampton Wanderers 2–3 Derby County

League Cup

FA Cup
 4–6 January: Burnley 2–2 Derby County (Chalk, Comyn)
 14–15 January: Derby County 2–0 Burnley (replay; abandoned 75' due to freezing fog) (Gee, Patterson)
 25 January: Derby County 2–0 Burnley (replay) (Williams, Ormondroyd)
 25–27 January: Derby County 3–4 Aston Villa (Gee 2, P. Williams)

Playoffs
 Blackburn Rovers 4–2 Derby County
 Derby County 2–1 Blackburn Rovers

References

Derby County F.C. seasons
Derby County F.C.